David Brown (1740–1812) was convicted of sedition because of his criticism of the United States federal government and received the harshest sentence for anyone under the Sedition Act of 1798 for erecting the Dedham Liberty Pole.

Brown was a veteran of the American Revolutionary War.

At the time, Brown went throughout the towns arguing against the newly formed national United States government.  In November 1798, Brown led a group in Dedham, Massachusetts, including Benjamin Fairbanks, in setting up a liberty pole with the words, "No Stamp Act, No Sedition Act, No Alien Bills, No Land Tax, downfall to the Tyrants of America; peace and retirement to the President; Long Live the Vice President," referring to then-President John Adams and Vice President Thomas Jefferson.

Brown was arrested in Andover, Massachusetts but because he could not afford the $4,000 bail, he was taken to Salem for trial.  Brown was tried in June 1799.  Brown wanted to plead guilty but Justice Samuel Chase wanted him to name everybody who had helped him or who subscribed to his writings.  Brown refused, was fined $480, and sentenced to eighteen months in prison, the most severe sentence then imposed under the Alien and Sedition Acts.

In December 1800, at the end of his term, Brown could not afford to pay the fine and President Adams refused to set him free.  In February 1801, approaching two years, the longest sentence of anyone under the Sedition Act, Brown again appealed to Adams and was again denied.

In 1801, newly elected President Thomas Jefferson pardoned Brown along with all violators of the act.

See also
List of people pardoned or granted clemency by the president of the United States

References 

People of Massachusetts in the American Revolution
1740 births
1812 deaths
Recipients of American presidential pardons
History of Dedham, Massachusetts